Charles Sullivan (April 24, 1899 – June 25, 1972), also known as Charlie Sullivan, was an American character actor who was born just before the turn of the 20th century on April 24, 1899. He would begin his acting career at the age of 25, in the silent film, His People (1925). Over his highly prolific 30-plus-year career some sources have him appearing in over 500 films, while the American Film Institute credits him with appearing in over 250 films.

Selected filmography

References

External links
 

American male silent film actors
20th-century American male actors
American male film actors
1899 births
1972 deaths